The center of gravity of a body is the point around which the resultant torque due to gravity forces vanishes.

Center of gravity or centre of gravity may also refer to:
Center of gravity (military), a concept developed by Carl Von Clausewitz, a Prussian military theorist
Center of Gravity (festival), an annual Canadian sport and music festival 
Geographical centre, sometimes known as "gravitational centre" (typically of a country, or other large region of the Earth)

See also
Center of gravity of an aircraft
Center of mass
Centre of gravity frame 
Centre of gravity wavelength
Metacentric height